Isaad Hamed Younis Gamaledin (born April 12, 1950) is an Egyptian actress, film producer, TV host and a script writer and author. Her debut was in the 1972 film "Unfulfilled Crime" starring Salah Zulfikar.

See also
 Cinema of Egypt
 Lists of Egyptian films
 Salah Zulfikar filmography

References

Sources
 
 
 

1950 births
Living people
Actresses from Cairo
Egyptian film producers
Egyptian screenwriters
Mass media people from Cairo